Christmas in Love is a 2004 cinepanettone film starring Christian De Sica, Danny DeVito, Massimo Boldi, Cristiana Capotondi and Ronn Moss. The film was directed by Neri Parenti.

The film was nominated for a Golden Globe Award for Best Original Song at the 63rd Golden Globe Awards.

Plot 
Fabrizio Barbetti (Christian De Sica) and Lisa Pinzoni (Sabrina Ferilli) are two remarried doctors who, since divorce, have been simply unable to get along with each other. They hate one another to such an extent that they argue and fight in public, even on television, but their lives as a divorced couple are going to change as they establish, with their respective new partners, to spend their Christmas holidays in Gstaad, Switzerland. Here, after a difficult start, the two end up falling again for each other and begin planning to make their partners do so as well, so that they can end their current relationships and start a new life together. However, they ignore that Angela (Fabrizio's new wife) and Gabriele (Lisa's current husband) have been cheating on them for a year and are already in a relationship. In fact, the vacation was planned by them in order to make Fabrizio and Lisa want to get back together.

Actors 
Christian De Sica: Fabrizio Barbetti
Danny DeVito: Brad La Guardia
Massimo Boldi: Guido Baldi
Sabrina Ferilli: Lisa Pinzoni
Ronn Moss: Himself
Anna Maria Barbera: Concetta La Rosa
Cristiana Capotondi: Monica Baldi
Tosca D'Aquino: Angela Barbetti
Cesare Bocci: Gabriele Perla
Alena Seredova: Sofia

See also 
 List of Italian films of 2004

References

External links 
 

2004 films
2004 romantic comedy films
2000s Italian-language films
English-language Italian films
2000s English-language films
Italian Christmas comedy films
Films directed by Neri Parenti
Films scored by Bruno Zambrini
2004 multilingual films
Italian multilingual films